"Dance Like Nobody's Watching" (abbreviated as "DLNW") is a 2020 pop song by Australian rapper Iggy Azalea and American singer-songwriter Tinashe. It was released on 21 August 2020, intended as the lead single from Azalea's third studio album End of an Era. It was later revealed that it would no longer serve as a lead single and would be a standalone single.

Background and release
After teasing a new song under the title "DLNW" on August 14, Azalea later revealed the title to be "Dance Like Nobody's Watching", a collaboration with American singer, songwriter Tinashe. The duo had previously collaborated on the remix of "All Hands on Deck" from Tinashe's debut album, Aquarius (2014). Following this, Tinashe was supposed to be the opening act for Azalea's The Great Escape Tour (2015), though it was ultimately cancelled. The song was originally released as the first single for Azalea's new album, End of an Era, but was later scrapped and issued as a stand-alone single.

A lyric video was released on August 21, 2020, at midnight EST, upon song release. The video features behind-the-scenes photos and videos from the cover art shoot. The song was released on digital outlets on August 21.

Critical reception 
The track received mixed to positive reviews from critics, with some describing it as a "Summer Anthem" and a very strong track, while others deeming it to be "Average." In a positive review, Thomas Bleach described the track as "a lot of fun. It's the right amount of sassy and empowering along with playful elements that give you classic Iggy vibes."

Track listing 

CD single 

 Dance Like Nobody's Watching (Explicit)
 Dance Like Nobody's Watching (Clean)
 Dance Like Nobody's Watching (Club Remix)

Digital download

 Dance Like Nobody's Watching

Charts

Release history

References

2020 singles
2020 songs
Iggy Azalea songs
Tinashe songs
Songs written by Iggy Azalea
Songs written by Tinashe
Empire Distribution singles